is a former Japanese football player. He played for Japan national team.

Club career
Kitaguchi was born in Osaka Prefecture on March 8, 1935. After graduating from Kwansei Gakuin University, he joined Mitsubishi Motors in 1957. In 1965, Mitsubishi Motors joined new league Japan Soccer League. He retired in 1966. He played 4 games in the league.

National team career
In 1956, when Kitaguchi was a Kwansei Gakuin University student, he was selected Japan national team for 1956 Summer Olympics in Melbourne, but he did not compete. In May 1958, he was selected Japan for 1958 Asian Games. At this competition, on May 26, he debuted against Philippines. He played 10 games and scored 1 goal for Japan until 1959.

National team statistics

References

External links
 
 Japan National Football Team Database

1935 births
Living people
Kwansei Gakuin University alumni
Association football people from Osaka Prefecture
Japanese footballers
Japan international footballers
Japan Soccer League players
Urawa Red Diamonds players
Olympic footballers of Japan
Footballers at the 1956 Summer Olympics
Footballers at the 1958 Asian Games
Association football forwards
Asian Games competitors for Japan